Nervilia crociformis, commonly known as the trembling nervilia or round shield orchid, is a small terrestrial orchid found in South and Southeast Asia and in New Guinea and northern Australia. It has a single short-lived green flower with a white labellum. A more or less circular leaf held horizontally above the ground emerges at the base of the flowering stem after flowering.

Description
Nervilia crociformis is a terrestrial, perennial, deciduous, sympodial herb which grows in clonal colonies with only a few individuals producing flowers in any one year. The flower only lasts for two or three days, following which a single leaf develops, including on those plants that did not flower. The leaf is dark green, more or less circular,  in diameter with about ten radiating veins. Flowering occurs between November and December in Australia and from May to June in India.

Taxonomy and naming
Trembling nervilia was first formally described in 1846 by Heinrich Zollinger and Alexander Moritzi who gave it the name Bolborchis crociformis and published the description in the Moritzi's book Systematisches verzeichniss der von H. Zollinger. In 1978, Gunnar Seidenfaden changed the name to Nervilia crociformis.

Distribution and habitat
Nervilia crociformis occurs in Tropical Africa, Southern Africa, islands of the western Indian Ocean, Taiwan, the Indian subcontinent, Indochina, Malesia, New Guinea, Queensland, New Caledonia, Samoa and Vanuatu. It grows in moist deciduous forests and on the edges of rainforest.

References 

crociformis
Plants described in 1846
Orchids of Queensland
Orchids of Africa
Orchids of Taiwan
Orchids of New Caledonia
Orchids of New Guinea